Daniel Joseph Feeney (September 12, 1894 – September 15, 1969) was an American prelate of the Roman Catholic Church. He served as bishop of the Diocese of Portland in Maine from 1955 until his death in 1969

Biography

Early life 
Daniel Feeney was born on September 12, 1894, in Portland, Maine, to Daniel Joseph and Mary Ann (née Quinn) Feeney. His father worked as superintendent of the Portland Gas Company. Raised in St. Dominic's Parish in Portland, he attended public schools and graduated from Portland High School in 1912. Feeney studied at the College of the Holy Cross in Worcester, Massachusetts, from 1913 and 1915. He then attended the Grand Seminary of Montreal in Montreal, Quebec, for six years.

Feeney was ordained to the priesthood in  Montreal by Archbishop Georges Gauthier for the Diocese of Portland on May 21, 1921. He then served as assistant pastor at St. Mary's Parish in Orono, Maine from 1921 to 1926, and as superintendent of diocesan schools from 1926 to 1929. He was pastor of the Nativity of the Blessed Virgin Mary Parish in Presque Isle, Maine, from 1929 to 1946.

Auxiliary Bishop and Coadjutor Bishop of Portland 
On June 22, 1946, Feeney was appointed auxiliary bishop of the Diocese of Portland and Titular Bishop of Sita  by Pope Pius XII. Feeney, who was Portland's first native bishop, received his episcopal consecration on September 12,1946, his fifty-second birthday, from Archbishop Amleto Cicognani, with Bishops Matthew Brady and Joseph McCarthy serving as co-consecrators, in the Cathedral of the Immaculate Conception in Portland. He performed many of Bishop McCarthy's administrative duties due to the latter's poor health, and became apostolic administrator in 1948.  Pius XII appointed him as coadjutor bishop of the diocese on March 4, 1952.

Bishop of Portland 
Feeney succeeded McCarthy as the seventh bishop of Portland upon his death on September 9, 1955. During his tenure, Feeney opened a number of rectories, convents, schools, social centers, parish halls, and the diocesan chancery.He also freed the Portland diocese of its considerable debt, which was his self-proclaimed greatest tangible accomplishment. From 1962 to 1965, Feeney attended the Second Vatican Council in Rome and was subsequently active in implementing the council's reforms, such as by modernizing the cathedral.

Daniel Feeney died on September 15, 1969, at age 75, having spent his last several months at Mercy Hospital in Portland. His funeral Mass was held at St. Dominic Parish, as the cathedral was closed for renovation.

References

External links
Catholic-Hierarchy
Diocese of Portland

1894 births
1969 deaths
People from Portland, Maine
Roman Catholic bishops of Portland
20th-century Roman Catholic bishops in the United States
Participants in the Second Vatican Council